Paragus is a genus of hoverflies.

Species

Subgenus: Afroparagus Vujić & Radenković, 2008
P. borbonicus Macquart, 1842

Subgenus: Pandasyopthalmus Stuckenberg, 1954

P. ascoensis Goeldlin, 1981
P. atratus Meijere, 1906
P. basilewskyi Doesburg, 1955
P. chalybeatus Hull, 1964
P. coadunatus Rondani, 1847
P. dolichocerus Bezzi, 1915
P. gracilis Stuckenberg, 1954
P. haemorrhous Meigen, 1822
P. jozanus Matsumura, 1916
P. longiventris Loew, 1858
P. marshalli Bezzi, 1915
P. minutus Hull, 1964
P. naso Stuckenberg, 1954
P. nasutus Bezzi, 1915
P. nigrocoeruleus Hull, 1949
P. politus Wiedemann, 1830
P. punctatus Hull, 1949
P. tibialis (Fallén, 1817)

Subgenus: Paragus Latreille, 1804
P. bicolor (Fabricius, 1794)
P. bispinosus Vockeroth, 1986
P. cooverti Vockeroth, 1986
P. quadrifasciatus Meigen, 1822
P. variabilis Vockeroth, 1986

Subgenus: Serratoparagus Vujić & Radenković, 2008
P. crenulatus Thompson, 1869
P. pusillus Stuckenberg, 1954

In need of organisation

P. absidatus Goeldlin, 1971
P. albifrons (Fallén, 1817)
P. albipes Gimmerthal, 1842
P. ambalaensis Sodhi & Singh, 1991
P. angustifrons Loew, 1863
P. angustistylus Vockeroth, 1986
P. arizonensis Vockeroth, 1986
P. asiaticus Peck, 1979
P. bradescui Stanescu, 1981
P. cinctus Schiner & Egger, 1853
P. clausseni Mutin, 1999
P. compeditus Wiedemann, 1830
P. constrictus Simic, 1986
P. dauricus Mutin, 1999
P. finitimus Goeldlin, 1971
P. flammeus Goeldlin, 1971
P. glumaci Vujic, Simic & Radenkovic, 1999
P. hermonensis Kaplan, 1981
P. hyalopteri Marcos-Garcia & Rojo, 1994
P. kitincheevi Barkalov & Goguzokov, 2001
P. kopdagensis Claussen, 1997
P. leleji Mutin, 1985
P. longistylus Vockeroth, 1986
P. majoranae Rondani, 1857
P. medeae Stanescu, 1991
P. oltenicus Stanescu, 1877
P. oltenicus Stanescu, 1977
P. pecchiolii Rondani, 1857
P. punctulatus Zetterstedt, 1838
P. romanicus Stanescu, 1992
P. sexarcuatus Bigot, 1862
P. strigatus Meigen, 1822
P. vandergooti Marcos-Garcia, 1986

References

Diptera of North America
Diptera of Europe
Diptera of Africa
Hoverfly genera
Syrphinae
Articles containing video clips
Taxa named by Pierre André Latreille